The 2019 Deutschland Cup was the 30th edition of the tournament, held between 7 and 10 November 2019.

Standings

Results

References

Deutschland Cup
Deutschland Cup
2019
Deutschland Cup